Amelia Jones (born July 14, 1961) originally from Durham, North Carolina is an American art historian, art theorist, art critic, author, professor and curator. Her research specialisms include feminist art, body art, performance art, video art, identity politics, and New York Dada. Jones's earliest work established her as a feminist scholar and curator, including through a pioneering exhibition and publication concerning the art of Judy Chicago; later, she broadened her focus on other social activist topics including race, class and identity politics. Jones has contributed significantly to the study of art and performance as a teacher, researcher, and activist.

Education and personal life 
She is the daughter of Virginia Sweetnam Jones and Edward E. Jones, a Princeton Psychology professor. She studied art history as an undergraduate at Harvard University and completed her M.A. at the University of Pennsylvania. She received her Ph.D. from UCLA in 1991. Her dissertation was later turned into a published book, Postmodernism and the Engendering of Marcel Duchamp (1994). On March 7, 1987, Jones married Anthony Sherin, a film editor. They divorced in 2005. In 2007, Jones married artist Paul Donald. She has two children, Evan and Vita, from her first marriage. Jones currently resides in Los Angeles, California.

Career 
After completing her PhD, Jones left Los Angeles to teach at universities throughout the United States as well as in Manchester, England and Montreal, Canada. She has taught art history at University of California, Riverside and the University of Manchester, where she served as the Pilkington Chair of the department. She also served as the Grierson Chair in Visual Culture at McGill University in Montreal and has held visiting professorships at Maine College of Art, Texas Christian University, University of Colorado, Boulder, and Washington University in St. Louis. She is currently the Robert A. Day Professor and Chair of Critical Studies at the USC Roski School of Art and Design, where she also serves as Vice Dean of Research. She is affiliated faculty in the Department of American Studies and Ethnicity in the USC Dornsife College of Letters, Arts and Sciences.

In addition to her work in academia, Jones has also curated a number of exhibitions, including Sexual Politics: Judy Chicago's Dinner Party in Feminist Art History (1996) at the Hammer Museum, The Politics of Difference: Artists Explore Issues of Identity (1991) at the Chandler Art Museum at University of California, Riverside, and Material Traces: Time and the Gesture in Contemporary Art (2013) at the Leonard and Bina Ellen Gallery at Concordia University in Montreal. She is also independently organizing a retrospective exhibition on the work of American performance artist Ron Athey.

Through art history, Amelia Jones has spoken out against cultural biases related to gender and race during her career. She has challenged most authoritative voices for insistently promoting a straight white-male perspective. Her work is committed to representing artists who are women, queer or people of color.

Books  
Jones is the author and editor of numerous books and anthologies on art history, performance studies, queer studies, and visual culture. She currently serves as co-editor of the Manchester University Press series Rethinking Art's Histories with Martha Meskimmon. Jones has edited A Companion to Contemporary Art since 1945, a collection of art history and criticism by contributors who write on such topics as technology, formalism, public space, diasporas, culture wars, the avant-garde, and the society of the spectacle. She has also edited The Feminism and Visual Culture Reader, the seven part work of Provocations, Representation, Difference, Disciplines/Strategies, Mass culture/Media interventions, Body, and Technology.

The following is a selection of works written or edited by Amelia Jones:

 Postmodernism and the En-Gendering of Marcel Duchamp.  New York: Cambridge University Press, 1994.
 Sexual Politics: Judy Chicago's 'Dinner Party' in Feminist Art History.  Berkeley: University of California Press, 1996.
 Body Art/Performing the Subject. Minneapolis: Minnesota University Press, 1998.
 Warr, Tracey and Amelia Jones (eds.). The Artist's Body.  London: Phaidon, 2000.
 The Feminism and Visual Culture Reader. New York: Routledge, 2003.
 Irrational Modernism: A Neurasthenic History of New York Dada.  Cambridge, Massachusetts: MIT Press, 2004.
 Self/Image: Technology, Representation, and the Contemporary Subject. New York: Routledge, 2006.
 “The Artist is Present”: Artistic Re-enactments and the Impossibility of Presence. TDR, Vol. 55, No. 1 (Spring 2011), p. 16-45. Posted Online February 16, 2011.
 Heathfield, Adrian and Amelia Jones (eds.). Perform, Repeat, Record: Live Art in History. Chicago: University of Chicago Press, 2012.
 Seeing Differently: A History and Theory of Identification and the Visual Arts. New York: Routledge, 2012.
 "Sexuality" London: Whitechapel Gallery, 2014.
 Silver, Erin and Amelia Jones (eds.). Otherwise: Imagining queer feminist art histories. Manchester: Manchester University Press, 2015.
 In between subjects: a critical genealogy of queer performance. New York: Routledge, 2021.

Awards 
Throughout Amelia Jones' career she has been recognized for her valuable contributions to the art world. She has also been recognized for her progressive work with feminist ideas. She was award the Distinguished Feminist Award in 2015 which honors art, scholarship, or advocacy advancing the cause of equality for women in the arts. Previous winners of the award include The Guerrilla Girls, Lucy Lippard and Lorraine O’Grady. Jones received a few awards prior that acknowledge her success as an art historian and feminist activist.

Awards Amelia Jones received:

 Distinguished Feminist Award, 2015
 National Endowment for the Humanities, 2000–01 
 Guggenheim fellow, 2000.
 Fellow of American Council of Learned Societies, 1994–95

References

American art historians
American feminists
Living people
Harvard University alumni
University of Pennsylvania alumni
University of California, Los Angeles alumni
University of California, Riverside faculty
Women art historians
1961 births
American women historians
21st-century American women
American women curators
American curators
Washington University in St. Louis faculty
University of Colorado Boulder faculty
Texas Christian University faculty
Maine College of Art faculty
Academic staff of McGill University